Christina, Montana is an unincorporated community in Fergus County, Montana, United States.

History
A post office was first established as Saltbrook in 1884. The post office was renamed Christina in 1885, it closed temporarily in 1896, reopened in 1899, closed again in 1907, was reestablished in 1914, and closed permanently in 1988. The community was named in honor of Christina Hilger, wife of David Hilger.

Notable person
Christine Donisthorpe, New Mexico legislator, was born in Christina.

Notes

Unincorporated communities in Fergus County, Montana
Unincorporated communities in Montana